Darwish Pasha al-Kurji (also known as Osmanzade Dervish Pasha) was an Ottoman statesman who served as wali (governor) of Sidon in 1770–1771 and Damascus in 1783–1784. He was the son of Uthman Pasha al-Kurji, who was of Georgian origin.

Darwish Pasha owed his assignment as Wali of Sidon in September 1771 to his father's influence with the Sublime Porte (Ottoman imperial government). Darwish Pasha was dismissed from Sidon in October 1771 after fleeing Sidon after arrival of the rebellious Arab sheikh of Galilee, Zahir al-Umar, who occupied the city. Darwish Pasha was subsequently appointed wali of Karaman in November. He was appointed wali of Damascus in June 1783, replacing his brother Muhammad Pasha al-Kurji who died shortly after taking office. However, the Sublime Porte deemed Darwish Pasha to be incompetent and ultimately replaced him with Ahmad Pasha al-Jazzar.

References

Bibliography

 
 

Year of birth unknown
18th-century people from the Ottoman Empire
Ottoman governors of Damascus
Ottoman governors of Sidon
Georgians from the Ottoman Empire